SWOD may refer to:

 The pointer (user interface)
 A Special Weapons Ordnance Device (SWOD), the antiship variant of the Bat (guided bomb)
 The  basement area of Selfridges, Oxford Street, named after the four streets - Somerset, Wigmore, Orchard and Duke – that once enclosed it.